The 2014 United States House of Representatives elections in Illinois were held on Tuesday, November 4, 2014 to elect the 18 U.S. representatives from the state of Illinois, one from each of the state's 18 congressional districts. The elections coincided with the elections of other federal and state offices, including Governor of Illinois and United States Senate. The GOP gained two seats in this election, one in the 10th district with the election of Bob Dold in a rematch with incumbent Brad Schneider, and one in the 12th district with the election of Mike Bost over incumbent William Enyart. The gains narrowed the Democrat margin to 10-8 in the delegation.

Overview
Results of the 2014 United States House of Representatives elections in Illinois by district:

District 1

The 1st district included a portion of Chicago as well as all or parts of the nearby suburbs of Alsip, Crestwood, Oak Forest, Tinley Park, Frankfort, Mokena and Elwood. The incumbent is Democrat Bobby Rush, who had represented the district since 1993. He was re-elected with 74% of the vote in 2012 and the district had a PVI of D+28.

Jimmy Lee Tillman III, a son of former Chicago Alderman Dorothy Tillman, was the Republican nominee.

Bobby Rush won re-election over Tillman in a landslide.

Primary results

General election
Rush was re-elected by 46 points. His victory was expected, as the district is solidly Democratic.

Results

District 2

The incumbent is Democrat Robin Kelly, who had represented the district after being elected with 71% of the vote in a special election in April 2013. The district had a PVI of D+29.

Marcus Lewis, a postal worker who ran as an Independent candidate for the seat in 2012 and in the special election; and Charles Rayburn, who finished fifteenth in the Democratic primary for the seat in the special election, both challenged Kelly in the Democratic primary. Kelly won the primary.

Eric Wallace, who finished second in the Republican primary for the seat in the special election, was the Republican nominee. Wallace lost to Kelly in a landslide.

Primary results

General election
Kelly was re-elected by 57 points.

Results

District 3

The incumbent is Democrat Dan Lipinski, who has represented the district since 2005. He was re-elected with 69% of the vote in 2012 and the district has a PVI of D+5.

Sharon Brannigan, a Palos Township Trustee; and Diane Harris, a Will County Republican precinct committeewoman, sought the Republican nomination to challenge Lipinski. Brannigan won the primary and became the Republican nominee. Brannigan lost to Lipinski in the general election.

Primary results

General election
Lipinski was re-elected in a 29-point landslide.

Results

District 4

The 4th district includes portions of Chicago as well as all or parts of the nearby suburbs of Cicero, Berwyn, Riverside, North Riverside, Brookfield, La Grange Park, Hillside, Berkeley, Stone Park and Melrose Park. The incumbent is Democrat Luis Gutiérrez, who has represented the 4th district since 1993. He was re-elected with 83% of the vote in 2012 and the district has a PVI of D+29.

Alexandra Eidenberg, a small business advocate, and Jorge Zavala, a diplomatic agent for the Consulate General of Mexico, challenged Gutiérrez in the Democratic primary. Gutiérrez won the primary.

The district's Republican nominee was Hector Concepcion, the executive director for the Puerto Rican Chamber of Commerce.

Concepcion lost to the incumbent Representative, Gutiérrez, in this solidly Democratic district.

Primary results

General election
Gutiérrez was re-elected by 56 points.

Results

District 5

The incumbent is Democrat Mike Quigley, who has represented the district since 2009. He was re-elected with 66% of the vote in 2012 and the district has a PVI of D+16.

Frederick White was seeking the Republican nomination to challenge Quigley. On December 20, 2013, White withdrew from the race.

Nancy Wade, a community activist and schoolteacher who ran as the Green Party nominee in 2012, is running again. Republican businessman and major GOP donor, Vince Kolber filed to run for the general election.

Primary results

General election
Quigley won re-election against his Republican challenger, Vince Kolber, by 32 points.

Results

District 6

The incumbent is Republican Peter Roskam, who has represented the district since 2007. He was re-elected with 59% of the vote in 2012 and the district has a PVI of R+4.

Michael Mason, a retired postal manager, is the Democratic nominee.

Primary results

General election

Results

District 7

The 7th district includes portions of Chicago as well as all or parts of the nearby suburbs of Cicero, Berwyn, Riverside, North Riverside, Oak Park, River Forest, Forest Park, Maywood, Broadview and Westchester. The incumbent is Democrat Danny K. Davis, who has represented the district since 1997. He was re-elected with 85% of the vote in 2012 and the district has a PVI of D+36.

Robert Bumpers is the Republican nominee.

Primary results

General election

Results

District 8

The incumbent is Democrat Tammy Duckworth, who has represented the district since 2013. She was elected with 55% of the vote in 2012, defeating Republican incumbent Joe Walsh. The district has a PVI of D+8.

Manju Goel, a healthcare consultant, and Larry Kaifesh, a Colonel in the United States Marine Corps, sought the Republican nomination to challenge Duckworth. Kaifesh won the primary.

Primary results

General election

Results

District 9

The incumbent was Democrat Jan Schakowsky, who had represented the district since 1999. She was re-elected with 66% of the vote in 2012 and the district had a PVI of D+15.

Susanne Atanus and David Earl Williams III ran for the Republican nomination to challenge Schakowsky. Atanus won the primary, with 15,412 (52.4%) votes.

Primary results

General election

Results

District 10

The incumbent was Democrat Brad Schneider, who had represented the district since 2013. He was elected with 51% of the vote in 2012, defeating Republican incumbent Bob Dold. The district had a PVI of D+8.

Dold was the Republican nominee, and won the rematch.

Primary results

General election

Polling

Results

District 11

The incumbent is Democrat Bill Foster, who has represented the district since 2013 and previously represented the 14th district from 2008 to 2011. He was elected with 59% of the vote in 2012, defeating Republican incumbent Judy Biggert. The district has a PVI of D+8.

Primary results

Grundy County Board member Chris Balkema, radio talk show host Ian Bayne, businessman Bert Miller, Craig Robbins and State Representative Darlene Senger all sought the Republican nomination to challenge Foster.

General election

Polling

Results

District 12

The incumbent was Democrat William Enyart, who was running to be elected for a second term. He was first elected with 52% of the vote in 2012, succeeding retiring Democratic incumbent Jerry Costello. The district had an even PVI.

State Representative Mike Bost was the Republican nominee.

Paula Bradshaw, a nurse and local radio talk show host who had previously run as the Green Party nominee in 2012, ran for a second time.

Primary results

General election

Polling

Results

District 13

The incumbent is Republican Rodney L. Davis, who has represented the district since 2013. He was elected with 47% of the vote in 2012, succeeding retiring Republican incumbent Tim Johnson. The district has an even PVI.

Steve Israel, chairman of the Democratic Congressional Campaign Committee, identified this district as one of his top targets for 2014.

Republican primary
Michael Firsching, a veterinarian, and Erika Harold, an attorney who also served as Miss America 2003, challenged Davis in the Republican primary. Firsching ran in the Republican primary for the seat in 2012, losing to then-incumbent Tim Johnson. Harold attempted to replace Johnson on the general election ballot following his retirement announcement, but was passed over for Davis.

Polling

Results

Democratic primary
Ann Callis, a former Madison County Chief Judge; George Gollin, a physicist at the University of Illinois at Urbana–Champaign; and David Green, a policy analyst at the University of Illinois at Urbana–Champaign, all sought the Democratic nomination. Callis won the primary. Bill Byrnes, a school bus driver, had also planned to run but ultimately withdrawn from the race. Champaign City Councilman Paul Faraci; State Senator Mike Frerichs; David Gill, a physician and four-time Democratic nominee; Chris Koos, the Mayor of Normal; and, Champaign County State's Attorney Julia Rietz, declined to run.

Polling

Results

General election

Polling

Results

District 14

The incumbent is Republican Randy Hultgren, who has represented the district since 2011. He was re-elected with 59% of the vote in 2012 and the district has a PVI of R+5.

Dennis Anderson, a public health researcher who unsuccessfully challenged Hultgren as the Democratic nominee in 2012, and John J. Hosta, a businessman, sought the Democratic nomination to challenge Hultgren.

Primary results

General election

Results

District 15

The incumbent is Republican John Shimkus, who has represented the district since 2013 and previously represented the 19th district from 2003 to 2013 and the 20th district from 1997 to 2003. He was re-elected with 69% of the vote in 2012 and the district has a PVI of R+14.

Eric Thorsland, a farmer, is the Democratic nominee.

Primary results

General election

Results

District 16

The incumbent was Republican Adam Kinzinger, who had represented the district since 2013 and previously represented the 11th district from 2011 to 2013. He was re-elected with 62% of the vote in 2012 and the district had a PVI of R+4.

David Hale, a nurse and founder of the Rockford Tea Party, challenged Kinzinger in the Republican primary.

Randall Olsen, a retired X-ray technician and Air Force veteran, was the Democratic nominee.

Primary results

General election

Results

District 17

The incumbent was Democrat Cheri Bustos, who had represented the district since 2013. She was elected with 53% of the vote in 2012, defeating Republican incumbent Bobby Schilling. The district had a PVI of D+7.

Schilling was the Republican nominee.

Primary results

General election

Polling

Results

District 18

The incumbent was Republican Aaron Schock, who had represented the district since 2009. He was elected with 74% of the vote in 2012 and the district had a PVI of R+11.

Rob Mellon, a schoolteacher and Army veteran, and Darrel Miller, a farmer, sought the Democratic nomination to challenge Schock.

Primary results

General election

Results

See also
 2014 Illinois elections
 2014 United States House of Representatives elections
 2014 United States elections

References

External links

U.S. House elections in Illinois, 2014 at Ballotpedia
Campaign contributions at OpenSecrets

Illinois
2014
United States House of Representatives